The 2020 Visit Tucson Sun Cup was the tenth edition of the preseason exhibition soccer tournament among Major League Soccer (MLS) and United Soccer League (USL) teams. It was held from February 15 to February 22 in Tucson and Phoenix, Arizona.

Teams 
The following clubs entered the tournament:

Major League Soccer
Columbus Crew SC (second appearance)
Houston Dynamo (fifth appearance)
New York Red Bulls (seventh appearance)
Real Salt Lake (seventh appearance)
Sporting Kansas City (seventh appearance)

USL Championship
Phoenix Rising FC (fourth appearance)

Matches 
All times are Mountain Standard Time (UTC-07:00)

Table standings

(C) - Cup Winner

Top scorers

References 

2020
2020 in American soccer
2020 in sports in Arizona
February 2020 sports events in the United States